Kyu-Shin is a comic book published by American company Scare Tactix Graphix. The comic is written by Mitch Hyman, with art by Ivonne Falcon and Alberto Cortes.

Publication history
The original script and story by Mitch Hyman, as well as the likeness created for the character by Ivonne Falcon under Hyman's direction, did not involve Ms. Kita at first. Candace Kita came on board the project after the book was completed and now due to an agreement with the comic company's owner, the comic book likeness of Kyu-Shin will be based on model and actress Candace Kita.

Fictional character biography
Kyu-Shin is a tale of redemption. It's the story of nameless girl sold by her destitute family into state slavery to become a member of the North Korean Olympic martial arts team. By the age of 9, she has already killed a half dozen opponents. The team comes to America, New York to be exact, to compete in a demonstration and while there she sneaks away to seek political asylum. After she is granted asylum, she finally knows true freedom. On her first night out as a free person, she encounters a man at a nightclub who turns out to be a member of an Asian gang of Vampires who are bent on taking over the city and building an empire of the undead.

She is taken to the leader of this gang, Kiyo is her name, and when they "turn" her they discover that because she has no name, has killed and has never had sex... She becomes not a vampire...but a damned soul. The Korean culture does NOT have Vampires...only ghosts. She is now truly a lost soul. The gods take pity on her and imbue her with awesome power over the supernatural while severely limiting her powers over the mortal realm. She has now become an agent and protector for good. She is out to redeem herself by saving the world...one soul at a time.

Notes

External links
Kyu-Shin at Scare Tactix Graphix

2009 comics debuts
Comics publications
Horror comics
Comics characters introduced in 2009